Psalm is an album by ex-Iona drummer Terl Bryant released in 1993.

Track listing
Disc – Total Time (56:38)
"The Lord Reigns" 5:07 
"Christ Be in Me" 4:23
"Here is Love" 5:07
"Israel" 4:37
"My Song is Love Unknown" 4;50
"Come Holy Ghost" 3:19
"Do Not Fear" 7:12
"Miriam" 5:57
"The King of Love" 3:16
"The Battle Prayer" 6:15
"God Be in My Head" 6:21

Personnel

 Terl Bryant – drums, percussion
 Juliet Bryant – backing vocals
 Dave Bainbridge – keyboards, guitar
 Peter Bonas – guitar, bass
 Dave Clifton – vocals, guitar
 Andy Coughlan – bass
 Phil Crabbe – percussion
 Troy Donockley – pipes, whistles
 Mark Edwards – keyboards
 Stuart Garrard – vocals, guitar
 Charlie Groves & Ali Groves – vocals, violin
 Pat Gruber – bass
 Mike Haughton – saxophone
 Joanne Hogg – vocals
 Tim Harries – bass
 Alex Legg – vocals
 Mike Parlett – saxophone
 Ben Okafor – vocals, percussion
 Nicole Riordan – backing vocals
 Mike Sturgis – percussion

Production
 Produced by Terl Bryant 
 Recorded by Neil Costello at The Soundfield, Derby, UK, 1995
 Mixed by Nigel Palmer 
 Mastered at Abbey Road Studios
 Executive Producer James Sanderson

Release details
1995, UK, Alliance Records ALD036, Release Date 22 August 1993, CD
1995, UK, Alliance Records ALC036, Release Date 22 August 1993, Cassette

External links
 Artist page
 "Psalm" remains available as a direct download

1993 albums
Terl Bryant albums